This is a list of yearly Patriot League football standings.

Patriot League standings

References

Patriot League
Standings